The 2000 Polish Speedway season was the 2000 season of motorcycle speedway in Poland.

Individual

Polish Individual Speedway Championship
The 2000 Individual Speedway Polish Championship final was held on 15 August at Piła.

Golden Helmet
The 2000 Golden Golden Helmet organised by the Polish Motor Union (PZM) was the 2000 event for the league's leading riders. The final was held at Wrocław on the 29 September.

Junior Championship
 winner - Rafał Okoniewski

Silver Helmet
 winner - Jarosław Hampel

Bronze Helmet
 winner - Rafał Chromik

Pairs

Polish Pairs Speedway Championship
The 2000 Polish Pairs Speedway Championship was the 2000 edition of the Polish Pairs Speedway Championship. The final was held on 8 September at Wrocław.

Team

Team Speedway Polish Championship
The 2000 Team Speedway Polish Championship was the 2000 edition of the Team Polish Championship. Polonia Bydgoszcz won the gold medal.

Ekstraliga

First round

Results

Final round

Upper Group

Lower Group

1.Liga

2.Liga

Promotion/relegation play offs
Grudziądz - Leszno 38-52 30:60						
Tarnów - Łódź 37:53 31:58

References

Poland Individual
Poland Team
Speedway
2000 in Polish speedway